"Losing Sleep" is a song do-written and recorded by American country music artist Chris Young. It was released on May 29, 2017 as the first single from his 2017 album of the same name. Young co-wrote this song with Chris DeStefano and Josh Hoge, and assisted Corey Crowder in production.

Critical reception
Billy Dukes of Taste of Country was somewhat critical of the song's arrangement, but wrote that the song is "sonically edgy and lyrically pointed," and that Young's performance comes across as "sincere." In a review of the similarly titled album, Matt Bjorke of Roughstock complimented the song's structure, writing that the juxtaposition of the "relaxed" verses and "frantic" chorus "is part of what makes the song work as well as it does and why it’s the anchor for this record." Jim Casey of Nash Country Daily wrote that the song falls in Young's "sexy-song wheelhouse" and praised the radio-friendly production.

Music video
The music video was directed by Peter Zavadil and premiered on CMT, GAC & VEVO in September 2017. Filmed at the Omni Hotel in downtown Nashville, Tennessee, the video follows Young and a female love interest as they prepare for a date and then meet in the hotel bar. Mood lighting is used to establish a "romantic mood," with critics describing the video as "sexy."

Commercial performance
"Losing Sleep" reached number one on the Billboard Country Airplay chart dated February 10, 2018, earning Young his ninth leader on the chart, and fourth consecutive number-one following the three singles released from previous album, I'm Comin' Over (2015). The song has sold 200,000 copies in the United States as of February 2018. "Losing Sleep" was certified Platinum by the Recording Industry Association of America in August 2018.

Charts

Weekly charts

Year-end charts

Certifications

References

2017 songs
2017 singles
Country ballads
2010s ballads
Chris Young (musician) songs
RCA Records Nashville singles
Songs written by Chris Young (musician)
Songs written by Chris DeStefano
Songs written by Josh Hoge